The 45th Superflo 12 Hours of Sebring presented by Chrysler was an endurance racing sports car event held at Sebring International Raceway from March 13–16, 1997. The race served as the second round of the 1997 IMSA GT Championship. The #3 Team Scandia Ferrari 333 SP took the overall victory driven by Yannick Dalmas, Stefan Johansson, Fermín Vélez, and Andy Evans.

Race results
Class winners in bold.

References

External links
 racingsportscars.com

12 Hours of Sebring
12 Hours of Sebring
12 Hours
12 Hours of Sebring